Cape Wilson may refer to:

 Cape Wilson (Ross Dependency)
 Cape Wilson (South Georgia)